Division Mountain is located on the Continental Divide along the Alberta - British Columbia border of Canada. It also straddles the shared boundary of Banff National Park with Kootenay National Park in the Canadian Rockies. It was named in 1919 by Charles D. Walcott since the mountain divides the Lyell Icefield from the Mons Icefield. 


Geology

The mountain is composed of sedimentary rock laid down during the Precambrian to Jurassic periods. Formed in shallow seas, this sedimentary rock was pushed east and over the top of younger rock during the Laramide orogeny.

Climate

Based on the Köppen climate classification, the mountain experiences a subarctic climate with cold, snowy winters, and mild summers. Temperatures can drop below -20 °C with wind chill factors below -30 °C in the winter.

See also
List of peaks on the British Columbia–Alberta border

References

Three-thousanders of Alberta
Three-thousanders of British Columbia
Mountains of Banff National Park
Kootenay National Park